Perelozhnikovo is a rural locality (a village) in Malyshevskoye Rural Settlement, Selivanovsky District, Vladimir Oblast, Russia. The population was 403 as of 2010. There are 5 streets.

Geography 
Perelozhnikovo is located 20 km southwest of Krasnaya Gorbatka (the district's administrative centre) by road. Bolshoye Koltsovo is the nearest rural locality.

References 

Rural localities in Selivanovsky District